Dibenzoylmethane (DBM) is an organic compound with the formula (C6H5C(O))2CH2.  DBM is the name for a 1,3-diketone, but the compound exists primarily as one of two equivalent enol tautomers.  DBM (actually its enol) is a white solid. Due to their high photostability and UV-absorbing properties, derivatives of DBM such as avobenzone, have found applications as sunscreen products.

Synthesis and reactions
DBM is prepared by condensation of ethyl benzoate with acetophenone.

Like other 1,3-diketones (or their enols), DBM condenses with a variety of bifunctional reagents to give heterocycles.  Hydrazine gives diphenylpyrazole.  Urea and thiourea also condense to give six-membered rings.  With metal salts, the conjugate base of DBM forms complexes akin to the metal acetylacetonates.

Occurrence and medicinal properties

Dibenzoylmethane (DBM) is a minor constituent in the root extract of Licorice (Glycyrrhiza glabra in the family Leguminosae). It is also found in Curcumin. These occurrences have led to investigations into the medicinal properties of this class of compounds.

DBM (and Trazodone) slow disease progression by preventing the cessation of protein synthesis in neurons.

Related compounds
 Benzoylacetone

References

Aromatic ketones
Chelating agents
Ligands
Phenyl compounds